Ocak is a quarter of the town Pazar, Pazar District, Rize Province, northeastern Turkey. Its population is 1,180 (2021).

History 
According to list of villages in Laz language book (2009), the name of the village is Sapu, which is derived from word "sapule", which means cemetery in the Laz language. Most villagers are ethnically Laz.

Geography

References

Populated places in Pazar District, Rize
Laz settlements in Turkey